Liam Trevaskis (born 18 April 1999) is an English cricketer. He made his Twenty20 cricket debut for Durham in the 2017 NatWest t20 Blast on 25 July 2017. He made his first-class debut for Durham in the 2017 County Championship on 25 September 2017. He made his List A debut on 17 April 2019, for Durham in the 2019 Royal London One-Day Cup.

References

External links
 

1999 births
Living people
English cricketers
Durham cricketers
Sportspeople from Carlisle, Cumbria
Cricketers from Cumbria